The Big Orange Chorus is a men's chorus  and chapter of the Barbershop Harmony Society based in Jacksonville, Florida. The chorus became a chartered member of the Sunshine District in Orange Park, a suburb of Jacksonville in 1980, and also attributes its name to this community. The primary musical focus of the chorus is a cappella music in the style of barbershop harmony, however their repertoire of music spans many styles and difficulty levels in addition to traditional barbershop. Over the years the membership of the chorus has grown to include men from all over the Jacksonville metropolitan area and beyond in the tri-state area of Florida, Georgia, and South Carolina.

The chorus has become a frequent competitor on the world stage. Most recently, The Big Orange Chorus was ranked 15th in the world at the Barbershop Harmony Society's International Competition in July, 2018, at the Orange County Convention Center in Orlando, Florida. The Big Orange Chorus also won the 2018 Sunshine District chorus championship  (their 10th time).

To support ongoing vocal development the chorus is committed to embracing, developing and introducing innovative uses of technology.  Digital learning materials in addition to specialized rehearsal approaches and methodologies enable Big Orange Chorus singers of all levels to develop world-class skills in preparation for both regional performances as well as international contests.  The result of these efforts is helping improve the quality of male a cappella singing not only within this chorus but also among similar choruses in the Southeastern United States.

The chorus is also referred to by the nickname "The Big O".

International competition 
The chorus has competed internationally nine times within the Barbershop Harmony Society. Their highest ranking was in 1986 when they placed 8th among all competetitors.

Appearances 

 9th-place finish in 2015 singing under Heralds of Harmony banner

Selection of songs list
Songs performed on the Barbershop Harmony Society's International stage:

External links
Big Orange Chorus website
Jacksonville Cultural Council article on the Big Orange Chorus.  Author: Frank Nosalek.  Published: 11/21/2013.  Retrieved: 1/16/2014.

References 

Barbershop Harmony Society choruses
Musical groups from Jacksonville, Florida
1980 establishments in Florida
Musical groups established in 1980